Thailand Practical Shooting Association (THPSA) (สมาคมกีฬายิงปืนรณยุทธแห่งประเทศไทย) is the Thai association for practical shooting under the International Practical Shooting Confederation.

External links 
 Official homepage of Thailand Practical Shooting Association

References 

Regions of the International Practical Shooting Confederation
Sports governing bodies in Thailand
Sports organizations established in 1986
1986 establishments in Thailand